Faces in the Dark is a 1960 black and white British thriller film directed by David Eady and starring John Gregson, Mai Zetterling and John Ireland. The film is based on the 1952 novel Les Visages de l'ombre by Boileau-Narcejac.

Plot
Richard Hammond, an aggressive and ambitious business mogul and inventor with little or no time for his wife, friends or family, is blinded in an explosion on the same day that his long-suffering wife had planned to leave him.  He becomes bitter at life.

His wife is a devious woman and is plotting, with her lover, in an attempt to make her husband think he's going insane, in the hope that he will take his own life and leave them free to pursue their illicit affair in peace.

As he is blind when he encounters the lovers in bed the man just has to stay silent to evade detection.

Hammond gets wise to their plan.

Cast
 John Gregson as Richard Hammond 
 Mai Zetterling as Christiane Hammond 
 John Ireland as Max Hammond 
 Michael Denison as David Merton 
 Tony Wright as Clem 
 Nanette Newman as Janet 
 Valerie Taylor as Miss Hopkins 
 Roland Bartrop as French Doctor

Production
The film was shot at Shepperton Studios with sets designed by the art director Anthony Masters. A collection of location stills and corresponding contemporary photographs is hosted at reelstreets.com.

Critical reception
The Radio Times wrote "this tale of blindness and rage should have been a real nail-biter. Sadly, ex-documentary director David Eady simply doesn't have the thriller instinct and throws away countless opportunities to make the tension unbearable." However, TV Guide wrote that "The film has some pot-holes, but the chilling climax is smooth as glass"; and Allmovie noted "Although there may be a few minor gaps here and there in the storyline, Faces in the Dark is a suspenseful drama."

References

External links

Drewe Shimon review

1960 films
Films based on works by Boileau-Narcejac
Films based on French novels
Films directed by David Eady
1960s thriller films
British thriller films
Films about blind people
Films scored by Mikis Theodorakis
Films shot at Shepperton Studios
1960s English-language films
1960s British films